These bouts consist of YouTubers, Twitch streamers, TikTokers, and online influencers.

List

Finished

Scheduled

Cancelled 

Boxing matches
Boxing-related lists
Boxing
Boxing
Crossover boxing events
Internet culture
YouTube
YouTube Boxing events

YouTube-related lists